Ali ibn Faramurz, was the Kakuyid Emir of Yazd and Abarkuh. He was the son of Faramurz.

Biography 

In 1076/1077, Ali married a daughter of Chaghri Beg named Khadija Arslan Khatun, who was the widow of the Abbasid Caliph Al-Qa'im (1031–1075). Ali was a faithful vassal of the Seljuqs and spent most of his reign at the court of the Seljuq sultan Malik-Shah I in Isfahan. He was a patron of the Persian poet Mu'izzi who wrote some poems dedicated to him.

After the death of Malik-Shah I in 1092, Ali supported his brother Tutush I who dominated the western part of the Seljuq Empire and considered his claim to the throne superior to Barkiyaruq's. Tutush, however, was decisively defeated in a battle near Ray in 1095, where he and Ali were killed. Ali was succeeded by his son Garshasp II.

References

Bibliography 
 Janine and Dominique Sourdel, Historical Dictionary of Islam, Éd. PUF, article Kakuyids, pp. 452–453. 
 
 
 

 

1095 deaths
11th-century monarchs in the Middle East
Date of birth unknown
Kakuyids
11th-century Iranian people